Robert A. "Rob" Gleason, Jr. is an American businessman who formerly served as Chair of the Pennsylvania Republican Party.

Early life, professional career and memberships
A 1956 graduate of Westmont Hilltop High School and a 1957 graduate of The Kiski School, Gleason graduated in 1961 from the University of Pennsylvania's Wharton School.

An insurance broker, Gleason served as Chair and CEO of The Gleason Agency, an insurance brokerage firm started by his grandfather and continued by his father, Robert A. Gleason. Gleason sold the business to Arthur J. Gallagher & Co. in 2010.

Gleason served as a trustee of Saint Francis University from 1978 to 1988 and the University of Pennsylvania from 1998 to 2013. Gleason is also a Kiski School trustee. Gleason was elected as a Westmont Hilltop Education Board member in 2019 and Board President in 2020.

Gleason also affiliates with various civic, philanthropic, and professional organizations serving as Chair of the Council of Insurance Agents and Brokers in 2000. Gleason was the Conemaugh Memorial Medical Center Trustee Board Chair and served as an Altoona-Johnstown Roman Catholic Diocese Foundation trustee and Secretary.

Political career

Appointed positions
Gleason served in Governor Dick Thornburgh's cabinet as Secretary of the Commonwealth from 1985 to 1987. In 1993, Governor Bob Casey nominated Gleason to be a member of the five-person Pennsylvania Turnpike Commission, where he served until 1997. In 1997, Governor Tom Ridge appointed Gleason to the State Transportation Commission.  President George Bush appointed Gleason to the Commission of Presidential Scholars from 2006 to 2010. President Donald Trump appointed Gleason to the United States Air Force Academy Board of Visitors from 2018 to 2021.

Republican Party politics

Cambria County
In 1996, Gleason succeeded his father, the late Robert A. Gleason Sr., as the Cambria County Republican Committee Chair.

Pennsylvania
In 2002, PoliticsPA named Gleason to its list of Pennsylvania's Best County Party Chairs, saying that Gleason "brings in money and gets things done" in a "tough county for any Republican."

In 2004, Gleason was Pennsylvania's Catholics for Bush co-chair. Gleason became the Republican Party of Pennsylvania Chair in June 2006, following the retirement of Eileen Melvin, serving until 2017.

In 2009, Politics Magazine ranked Gleason and his brother Chris first on their "The Pennsylvania Report 100" list of influential Republican figures in Pennsylvania politics. It noted that Gleason was "a hard worker and efficient manager of the state GOP." Gleason currently serves as a member of the Catholic Advisory Committee of the Republican National Committee.

In 2021, Gleason was named to the Pennsylvania Fifty Over 50 Power List by City and State PA Magazine.

References

External links

|-

Chairs of the Republican State Committee of Pennsylvania
Living people
Secretaries of the Commonwealth of Pennsylvania
Pennsylvania Republicans
People from Cambria County, Pennsylvania
United States Air Force officers
2016 United States presidential electors
Wharton School of the University of Pennsylvania alumni
Year of birth missing (living people)
Catholics from Pennsylvania
Military personnel from Pennsylvania